Janapahad is a small village in Palakeedu Mandal of Suryapet district, Telangana. It is about 18 km from Neredcherla and 53 km from the district headquarters Suryapet. Geographically located at 16.52N and 79.34E.

It is reputed for local darga known as Janapahad Saidulu Darga and people from around visit darga irreligiously. Every Fridays special prays and special celebration called "ursu" celebrating in a year. Musi river is passing nearby this village. Near to this village 2 cement factories are located namely Penna and Deccan. Road connectivity is there from Damaracherla, Neredcherla and Mattapally. Railway connectivity for cement industries is passing through this village.

Villages in Suryapet district